The 2012 French Indoor Athletics Championships was the 41st edition of the national championship in indoor track and field for France, organised by the French Athletics Federation. It was held on 25–26 February 2012 at the Jean-Pellez Stadium in Aubière. A total of 26 events (divided evenly between the sexes) were contested over the two-day competition.

Results

Men

Women

References

Results
 Results. French Athletics Federation  

French Indoor Athletics Championships
French Indoor Athletics Championships
French Indoor Athletics Championships
French Indoor Athletics Championships
Sport in Puy-de-Dôme